The Department of Management Studies, IIT Delhi, also known as DMS IIT Delhi, is the school of management education and research in Indian Institute of Technology, Delhi. The department established in 1993 by an amendment in IIT Delhi statutes, currently runs a two year full time MBA programme with focus on Management Systems, a two-year full-time MBA with focus on Telecommunication Systems Management under the aegis of Bharti School of Telecom Technology and Management and a three-year on-campus evening MBA programme with focus on Technology Management.

History
The Department of Management Studies is a result of the revolutionary process of growth of an idea floated in 1963. What was then a seed, gradually came to life and in 1974 IIT Delhi set up an internal committee to scrutinize the functioning of the management area in the institute. In 1975, an expert committee was set up to formally examine the possibility of launching this area in a more sustained fashion. The result was an M.Tech programme in "Management Systems" in the School for System Studies (subsequently renamed School for Systems and Management Studies). The year 1978 saw the setting up of the Management Core Group and the core inputs to a full-time Management Education at IIT(D) were reconfirmed by an Advisory Committee constituted by the representatives of the Academia and the industry. The School for Systems and Management Studies became the Centre for Systems and Management Studies. This was subsequently renamed as the Centre for Management Studies.

In 1993 the Department was brought into existence by amendment to IIT(D) statutes. Clearly, the Department responds to a felt need of the Indian Industry and derives satisfaction from its heavy field orientation in all its curriculum activity. In response to the feedback from the students, alumni and industry, the Department of Management Studies launched MBA programmes in 1997.

The department currently runs a two-year full-time MBA programme with focus on Management Systems, a two-year full-time MBA with focus on Telecommunication Systems Management under the aegis of Bharti School of Telecom Technology and Management and a three-year part-time MBA programme with focus on Technology Management. Apart from the specialised compulsory courses in the focus area, the students have choice for functional area specialization in finance, marketing, operations, information technology, HR etc.

MBA program in IIT- Delhi is designed keeping in mind the changes in business environment and the need of the industry.

The institute constantly endeavors to extend industry association and interaction to ensure further enrichment of academic content for the overall benefit of the industry, in particular and the society in general. The institute also provide consulting support to all category of industries in the areas covering all functional areas of management and is also engaged in research activities in various frontier areas of management. Currently DMSIITD has over forty registered Ph.D. scholars doing research work on various management issues. The institute invite industries to come forward for meaningful collaborative efforts.

Rankings

The Department of Management Studies IIT Delhi was ranked fourth among management schools in India by the National Institutional Ranking Framework (NIRF) in 2022.

References

External links
 Department of Management Studies, IIT Delhi's Official Website 

Business schools in Delhi
IIT Delhi
University departments in India
Educational institutions established in 1997
1997 establishments in Delhi